Esteban Martín (1 January 1937 – 25 August 1995) was a Spanish racing cyclist. He rode in the 1963 Tour de France.

References

External links
 

1937 births
1995 deaths
Spanish male cyclists
Place of birth missing
Cyclists from Madrid